Ram Dayal Singh was the  Gujar  Chieftain of Landhaura. He was the son of Chaudhari Nahar Singh. In 1790, Sikhs under Rae Singh Jagdhari and Sher Singh Buriya wrested Manglaur, Jaurasi and Jwalapur from Gujars of Landhaura and Landhaura became tributary of Sikhs. Later, in 1794, when Doab came under Maratha Governorship, he paid annual revenue to Gen. Perron and from 1803 onwards to British. Ram Dayal added number of villages to his estate with help of British Collector Mir Abdullah Khan. He was styled as Raja but as an estate holder and fiscal manager, did not have any ruling power. Ram Dayal Singh paid Rs 1,11,597 to the British every year.

Ram Dayal Singh paid Rs 1,11,597 to the British every year.

In Sept 1804, when the British called their garrison from Sharanpur to Delhi, there was a local rebellion popularly known as Azimgardi, after a Muslim Gujar Azim. Rebels killed Qanungo and many others. At this time, Ram Dayal Singh and Nain Singh Gujars supported East India Company.

Ram Dayal Singh died on 29 March 1813 and his death created a succession dispute between his grandson Badan Singh (from elder son Siwai Singh Gujar) and infant son Kushal Singh, from wife Dhan Kunwar. Dhan Kunwar applied to the British for Khilat for her infant son. British Collector Colin Shakespear considered Badan Singh of notoriously dissolute and disreputable conduct and recommended Khushal Singh as the heir. A settlement was reached where Dhan Kunwar paid a large sum of money and expensive goods to Badan Singh and kept Landhaura for her infant son.

References 

18th-century Indian monarchs
Year of birth missing
Place of birth missing
Year of death missing
Place of death missing
People from Haridwar district
People from Uttarakhand